Dallku is an Albanian surname. Notable people with the surname include:

 Ardin Dallku (born 1994), Kosovan football player
 Armend Dallku (born 1983), Albanian football player and manager

Albanian-language surnames